Sanday may refer to:

 Sanday, Inner Hebrides in the Small Isles
 Sanday, Orkney
 Sanday Airport
 Sanday Light Railway
 Sanday (surname)

See also
 Sanda Island off Kintyre
 Sandray in the Outer Hebrides
 Handa Island off Sutherland
 Sandoy, Faroe Islands
 Sandøy, Norway